Nawab Mir Akbar Ali Khan Siddiqi Bahadur, Sikander Jah, Asaf Jah III (11 November 1768 – 21 May 1829), was the 3rd Nizam/Ruler of Hyderabad, India from 1803 to 1829. He was born in Chowmahalla Palace in the Khilwath, the second son of Asaf Jah II and Tahniat un-nisa Begum.

Marriage
He was married (first) with Jahan Parwar Begum Sahiba (Haji Begum) daughter of Nawab Saif Ul Mulk (Maali Mian) son of Moin un Daula Nawab Gulam Said Khan Bahadir Surab Jang in May 1800. Second with Fazilath Unisa Begum (Chandni Begum).

Official name
His original names were Sikandar Jah, Asaf ul-Mulk, Asad ud-Daula, Walashan Nawab Mir Akbar 'Ali Khan Siddiqi Bahadur, Asad Jang. He was officially known as Asaf Jah III, Nizam ul-Mulk, Nizam ud-Daula, Mir Akbar 'Ali Khan Siddiqi Bahadur, Faulad Jang, Nizam of Hyderabad.

Military expansion

During his reign, a British cantonment was established near Hyderabad and the area was christened after him as Secunderabad. His son Samsamadaula (Mir Basheeruddin Ali Khan) was Defence Adviser to his brother, Nasir ud Daula, and nephew, Afzal ud daula.  But he did not have any pact with the British for maintaining the contingent. The state was in a financial mess during his reign.

Sikh Regiment
Upon the recommendation of Maharaja Chandu Lal, a Punjabi Khatri and influential dignitary at the Nizam's court. 1200+ Sikh soldiers joined the Nizam's army. Around 1830, Maharaja Ranjit Singh sent 150 more men under a Sardar Chanda Singh, for the construction of Gurdwara Takht Sachkhand Sri Hazur Sahib Abichalnagar at Nanded.

Building of temple
Sikander Jah not only built the Rambagh temple in Attapur, Hyderabad but also attended the inauguration ceremony proving again the communal harmony that existed between the Muslim Asaf Jahi rulers and their Hindu subjects in Hyderabad. The Nizam also granted a Jagir to the temple priest for the temple's maintenance.

See also
Kingdom of Hyderabad
Nizam

References

External links
VOYAGE OF HYDERABAD PART 8 "Sikandar Jah"

Nizams of Hyderabad
19th-century Indian royalty
19th-century Indian Muslims
1768 births
1829 deaths
Asaf Jahi dynasty
Secunderabad
Indian royalty
Indian monarchs